Sir Victor Sawdon Pritchett  (also known as VSP; 16 December 1900 – 20 March 1997) was a British writer and literary critic.

Pritchett was known particularly for his short stories, collated in a number of volumes.  His non-fiction works include the memoirs A Cab at the Door (1968) and Midnight Oil (1971), and many collections of essays on literary biography and criticism.

Biography
Victor Sawdon Pritchett was born in Suffolk, the first of four children of Walter Sawdon Pritchett and Beatrice Helena (née Martin). His father, a London businessman, relocated to Ipswich to establish a newspaper and stationery shop. The business ran into difficulty and his parents were lodging over a toy shop at 41 St Nicholas Street in Ipswich where Pritchett was born on 16 December 1900. Beatrice had expected a girl, whom she planned to name after Queen Victoria. Pritchett disliked his first name, hence he always preferred being styled by his initials "VSP", despite formally becoming "Sir Victor Pritchett" after being knighted.

Pritchett's father was a steady Christian Scientist but unsteady in all else.  Walter and Beatrice moved to Ipswich to be near her sister, who had married money and lived in Warrington Road. Within a year Walter was declared bankrupt, the family moved to Woodford, Essex, then to Derby and he began selling women's clothing and accessories as a travelling salesman.  Pritchett was soon sent with his brother Cyril to live with their paternal grandparents in Sedbergh, where the boys attended their first school. Walter's business failures, his casual attitude to credit and his easy deceitfulness obliged the family to move frequently. The family was reunited, but life was always precarious. They tended to live in London suburbs with members of Beatrice's family, but returned to Ipswich in 1910 to live for a year near Cauldwell Hall Road, trying to evade Walter's creditors. At this time Pritchett attended St John's School. Subsequently, the family moved to East Dulwich and he attended Alleyn's School, but when his paternal grandparents came to live with them at age 16, he was forced to leave school to work as a clerk and leather buyer in Bermondsey. At the same time his father enlisted to work in Hampshire at an aircraft factory to help the war effort. After the Great War Walter turned his hand to aircraft design, about which he knew nothing, and his later ventures included art needlework, property speculation and faith healing.

The leather work lasted from 1916 until 1920 when he moved to Paris to work as a shop assistant. In 1923 he started writing for The Christian Science Monitor, which sent him to Ireland and Spain. From 1926 he wrote reviews for that paper and for the New Statesman, later being appointed its literary editor.

Pritchett's first book, Marching Spain (1928), describes a journey across Spain, and his second book, Clare Drummer (1929), is about his experiences in Ireland. While he was there he met Evelyn Vigors, who he later married. Theirs was not a happy marriage.

Pritchett published five novels, but he said he did not enjoy writing them. His reputation was established by a collection of short stories, The Spanish Virgin and Other Stories (1932).

In 1936 he divorced his first wife and married Dorothy Rudge Roberts, by whom he had two children; the marriage survived until Pritchett's death in 1997, although they both had other relationships. Their children include the journalist Oliver Pritchett, whose son is the cartoonist Matt Pritchett MBE, and daughter is screenwriter Georgia Pritchett.

During the Second World War Pritchett worked for the BBC and the Ministry of Information while continuing to write weekly essays for the New Statesman.  After World War II he wrote extensively and embarked on various university teaching positions in the United States: Princeton (1953), the University of California (1962), Columbia University and Smith College. Fluent in French, German and Spanish, he published acclaimed biographies of Honoré de Balzac (1973), Ivan Turgenev (1977), and Anton Chekhov (1988).

Pritchett was appointed a Knight Bachelor in 1975 for "services to literature" and a Companion of Honour in 1993. His other awards included FRSL (1958), CBE (1968), the Heinemann Award (1969), the PEN Award (1974), the W.H. Smith Literary Award (1990) and the Golden PEN Award (1994). He was President of PEN International, the worldwide association of writers and the oldest human rights organisation from 1974 until 1976.

Sir V. S. Pritchett died of a stroke in London on 20 March 1997.

Bibliography
Marching Spain, 1928
Clare Drummer, 1929
The Spanish Virgin and Other Stories, 1932
Shirley Sanz, 1932
Nothing Like Leather, 1935
Dead Man Leading, 1937
This England, 1938 (editor)
You Make Your Own Life, 1938
In My Good Books, 1942
It May Never Happen, 1945
Novels and Stories by Robert Louis Stevenson, 1945 (editor)
Build the Ships, 1946
The Living Novel, 1946
Turnstile One, 1948 (editor)
Why Do I Write?: An Exchange of Views Between Elizabeth Bowen, Graham Greene, and V. S. Pritchett, 1948
Mr Beluncle, 1951
Books in General, 1953
The Spanish Temper, 1954
Collected Stories, 1956
The Sailor, The Sense of Humour and Other Stories, 1956
When My Girl Comes Home, 1961
London Perceived, 1962 (photographs by Evelyn Hofer)
The Key to My Heart, 1963
Foreign Faces, 1964
New York Proclaimed, 1965
The Working Novelist, 1965
The Saint and Other Stories, 1966
Dublin, 1967
A Cab at the Door, 1968
Blind Love, 1969
George Meredith and English Comedy, 1970
Midnight Oil, 1971
Penguin Modern Stories, 1971 (with others)
Balzac, 1973
The Camberwell Beauty, 1974
The Gentle Barbarian: the Life and Work of Turgenev, 1977
Selected Stories, 1978
On the Edge of the Cliff, 1979
Myth Makers, 1979
The Tale Bearers, 1980
The Oxford Book of Short Stories, 1981 (editor)
The Turn of the Years, 1982 (with R. Stone)
Collected Stories, 1982
More Collected Stories, 1983
The Other Side of a Frontier, 1984
A Man of Letters, 1985
Chekhov, 1988
A Careless Widow and Other Stories, 1989
Complete Short Stories, 1990
At Home and Abroad, 1990
Lasting Impressions, 1990
Complete Collected Essays, 1991
A Cab at the Door & Midnight Oil, 1994—
The Pritchett Century, 1997

Legacy
The V. S. Pritchett Memorial Prize was founded by the Royal Society of Literature at the beginning of the new millennium to commemorate the centenary of the birth of "an author widely regarded as the finest English short-story writer of the 20th century, and to preserve a tradition encompassing Pritchett's mastery of narrative". This prize is awarded annually, with up to £2,000 being given for the best unpublished short story of the year.

Perhaps his most prominent literary successor is the contemporary American Writer Darin Strauss, who has written widely about Pritchett, and who worked to get Pritchett's novel Mr Beluncle back into American print, providing a new introduction.

See also 
 Honoré de Balzac
 Royal Society of Literature

Notes

Explanatory notes

Citations

General sources 
 .
 .
 .
 .
 .
 .
 .

External links

 
 
 .
 .
 
 .
 VS Pritchett Memorial Prize (RSL) – past recipients
 Sir V.S. Pritchett at www.npg.org.uk
 Hans Koning's take on a review written by V.S. Pritchett (1968)
 Stuart A. Rose Manuscript, Archives, and Rare Book Library, Emory University: V.S. Pritchett collection, 1979-1982

Pritchett, V. S.
Pritchett, V. S.
Pritchett, V.S.
People educated at Alleyn's School
Pritchett, V. S.
Pritchett, V. S.
Pritchett, V. S.
Pritchett, V. S.
Pritchett, V. S.
Pritchett, V. S.
Pritchett, V. S.
20th-century English novelists
English male short story writers
English male novelists
Fellows of the Royal Society of Literature
20th-century British short story writers
20th-century English male writers
English male non-fiction writers
Presidents of the Society of Authors
Presidents of the English Centre of PEN